American Love Song is the sixth studio album by American singer-songwriter Ryan Bingham. It was released on February 15, 2019 on his own label Axster Bingham Records. The album was co-produced by singer-songwriter Charlie Sexton. 

"Wolves" was released as the first single from the album on November 29, 2018. The second single "Jingle and Go" was released on January 8, 2019.

Reception 
Stephen Thomas Erlewine of AllMusic described Bingham's work as "his most confident since his brief flirtation with the mainstream at the dawn of the 2010s". Erlewine also mentioned Sexton's work as having "given the album's 15 songs a rough-and-tumble feel suited for backwoods Texas juke joints".

Jim Beviglia from American Songwriter mentions that "American Love Song expertly and movingly shows how the overarching U.S.A. theme can encompass triumph and tragedy from one moment to the next."

American Love Song generally met positive reviews from critics with American Songwriter and Allmusic rating it 4/5 stars and Metacritic giving it a 83/100 rating.

Track listing

Personnel
Credits adapted from Tidal

Lead Musician

 Ryan Bingham - vocals , guitar 
 Charlie Sexton - guitar

Technical

 Charlie Sexton - producer, arranger
 Ryan Bingham - producer, arranger, composer
 Brian Lucey - mastering engineer
 Chris Bell - engineer
 Jacob Skiba - engineer
 Justin Stanley - engineer, mixer
 Kyle Crusham - engineer
 Grant Eppley - assistant engineer
 Joseph Holguin - engineer, assistant engineer

Artwork
 Anna Axster - photography, management
 Geoffrey Hanson - design, art direction

Charts

In popular culture 
The album's main single "Wolves" was inspired in part by the March For Our Lives students who were dealing with grown men and women questioning their integrity on social media. The song was also featured on the hit TV series Yellowstone. Bingham sang "Wolves" as the series' character Walker.

References

2019 albums
Ryan Bingham albums